Williamsville may refer to either of two small unincorporated communities in the U.S. state of Michigan:

Williamsville, Livingston County, Michigan
Williamsville, Cass County, Michigan